Almutairi, Al-Mutairi or Al Mutairi (المطيري) is an Arabic surname that may refer to
 Abdullah Al-Mutairi (born 1986), Saudi football player
 Adah Almutairi, American scholar, inventor, and entrepreneur
 Ahmad Almutairi (born 1994), Kuwaiti para-sport athlete
 Dhari Almutairi, Kuwaiti para-sport athlete
 Fuaad Al-Mutairi (born 1986), Saudi football player
 Helal Al-Mutairi (1855–1938), Kuwaiti businessman and politician
 Hussein Quwaian Al-Mutairi, member of the Kuwaiti National Assembly
 Khalid Abdullah Mishal al Mutairi, Kuwaiti charity worker
 Mashfi Al-Mutairi (born 1973), Kuwaiti sport shooter
 Meshaal Al-Mutairi, Saudi Arabian football player
 Mohammed Hayef al-Mutairi, member of the Kuwaiti National Assembly
 Mubarak Al-Mutairi, member of the Kuwaiti National Assembly
 Nawaf Al-Mutairi (born 1982), Kuwaiti football player
 Nawaf Al-Mutairi (handballer) (born 1989), Saudi Arabian handball player
 Radhi Al-Mutairi (born 1991), Saudi football player
 Rija Hujailan Al-Mutairi, member of the Kuwaiti National Assembly
 Saeed Al-Mutairi (born 1968), Saudi Arabian sport shooter
 Zaid Al-Mutairi (born 1982), Kuwaiti sport shooter
 Zeid Bin Mutlaq Al-Ja'ba Al-Dewish Al-Mutairi (died 2004), co-founder of Al-Nassr Football Club in Saudi Arabia
 Ziyad Al-Mutairi (born 1992), Saudi football player

See also
Al-Mutairi (tribe)

Arabic-language surnames